The Magura District is a district in south-western Bangladesh, situated 176 kilometers from Dhaka.  It is a part of Khulna Division. The main mode of transportation is by bus, and no train transport is available.

Administration
Magura district has 4 upazilas. They are:
Magura Sadar Upazila
Mohammadpur Upazila
Shalikha Upazila
Sreepur Upazila

Geography
Magura District (Khulna Division) with an area of 1048 km2, is bounded by Rajbari district to the north, Jessore and Narail districts to the south, Faridpur district to the east and Jhenaidah district to the west. The district is flat plain in the heart of the Ganges Delta.

Climate

Demographics 

According to the 2011 Bangladesh census, Magura District had a population of 918,419, of which 454,739 were males and 463,380 females. Rural population was 798,005 (86.89%) and urban population was 120,414 (13.11%). Magura had a literacy rate of 50.24% for the population 7 years and above: 52.87% for males and 46.31% for females.

Muslim population is 82.01% of the population while Hindus are 17.92% of the population. The Hindu population has stayed constant since 1981.

Notable residents
 Farrukh Ahmed, poet
 Shamsun Nahar Ahmed, Member of Parliament, was from Magura District.
 Syed Ali Ahsan, poet
 Mir Hasem Ali, elected as an MLA of East Bengal Legislative Assembly in 1954.
 Syed Ator Ali, elected as an MPA of East Pakistan Provincial Assembly in 1970, a Political Convenor of Sector No. 8 and 9 during Liberation War.
 M Yousuff Ali, fisheries biologist, policy planner, administrator and advocate for protecting the open water fishery resources.
 Mohammad Asaduzzaman, elected as an MP of Jatiya Sangsad for 3 times.
 Shakib Al Hasan, All-rounder, Bangladesh National Cricket Team
 Muhammad Sohrab Hossain Twice MNA Pakistan, Prominent Minister holding 8 ministry in Sheikh Mujib's cabinet. One of the founding fathers of Bangladesh and President of the first ever meeting in the Jessore District after the Liberation of Bangladesh.
 Kamrul Laila Jolly, former Member of Parliament
 Kazi Salimul Haque Kamal, two-term Member of Parliament for Magura-2
 Kazi Kader Newaj, poet
 Gangadhar Sen Roy, Ayurveda physician and Sanskrit scholar
 Biren Sikder, Former State Minister of Youth and Sports
 Saifuzzaman Shikhor, current MP of Magura-1

References

 
Districts of Bangladesh